María del Carmen Fernández Ugarte (born 18 May 1953) is a Mexican politician from the National Action Party. From 2007 to 2009 she served as Deputy of the LX Legislature of the Mexican Congress representing Coahuila.

References

1953 births
Living people
Politicians from Coahuila
Women members of the Chamber of Deputies (Mexico)
National Action Party (Mexico) politicians
21st-century Mexican politicians
21st-century Mexican women politicians
Deputies of the LX Legislature of Mexico
Members of the Chamber of Deputies (Mexico) for Coahuila